Lilo & Stitch: The Series (or simply known as Lilo & Stitch on its title card) is an American animated television series produced by Walt Disney Television Animation. It premiered on September 20, 2003 on ABC as part of ABC Kids, with a delayed premiere on Disney Channel on October 12, 2003. The series ended on July 29, 2006 after airing 65 episodes in two seasons.

A sequel spin-off of the 2002 feature film of the same name, and the follow-up to the August 2003 direct-to-video pilot Stitch! The Movie, it was the first of three television series produced in the Lilo & Stitch franchise, and the only one to retain the same setting as the original film. It was aired on Disney Channel worldwide, but has only been released on DVD in full in Japan, in four box sets. On November 12, 2019, the series was made available to stream on Disney+, immediately following the service's launch.

Plot
Continuing where Stitch! The Movie left off, Lilo and Stitch are given the task of collecting the rest of Jumba's missing experiments, changing them from bad to good, and finding the one place where they truly belong. Meanwhile, the former Captain Gantu and his reluctant partner, Experiment 625 (later named Reuben), try to capture the experiments for the imprisoned Dr. Hämsterviel.

Running for two seasons, it had a total of 65 episodes. The storyline of the series concluded with the Disney Channel broadcast of the television finale Leroy & Stitch on June 23, 2006.

Episodes

Crossover episodes
During its second season, Lilo & Stitch: The Series had crossovers with four other shows from Walt Disney Television Animation, three of which were airing during its run and one of which had already ended before the show's production began. According to executive producer Jess Winfield, these episodes were inspired by the four "Inter-Stitch-al" teaser trailers that were made for the original Lilo & Stitch film, which featured Stitch invading scenes in various Disney Renaissance films and ruins them.

 "Morpholomew" (season 2, episode 13) features American Dragon: Jake Long.
 "Spats" (season 2, episode 14) features The Proud Family.
 "Rufus" (season 2, episode 20) features Kim Possible.
 "Lax" (season 2, episode 21) features the kids from Recess.

Characters

Main
 Stitch (voiced by Chris Sanders), also known as Experiment 626, plus pilot and finale films is one of the two lead characters. After finding out about his 625 other experiment "cousins", he and Lilo set out to find them, reform them to good, and have them join their ever-expanding ohana. He also learns more about life on Earth along the way.
 Lilo Pelekai (voiced by Daveigh Chase) is the other lead character, she is Stitch's owner and best friend. She assists Stitch in finding his "cousins", naming them, and finding them a "one true place" where they can use their abilities for good.
 Dr. Jumba Jookiba (voiced by David Ogden Stiers) is the creator of the many genetic experiments, which include Stitch and Reuben. He lives with the Pelekai ohana after being exiled to Earth in the original film alongside Pleakley. He plays the role of Lilo and Nani's "uncle" in the ohana and wears a human disguise in public. He frequently assists Lilo and Stitch in capturing the experiments, usually by providing them with various tools he creates. 
 Pleakley (voiced by Kevin McDonald) is a former agent for the United Galactic Federation, he lives with the Pelekai ohana after being exiled to Earth in the original film alongside Jumba. He plays the role of Lilo and Nani's "aunt" in the ohana and frequently cross-dresses in the role. He also assists Lilo and Stitch in capturing the experiments, but to a lesser extent. He normally helps Nani out in maintaining the household. In the episode "Fibber", it was revealed that his first name is Wendy.
 Nani Pelekai (voiced by Tia Carrere) is Lilo's older sister and legal guardian, and caretaker of the household that they live in. She is usually busy and stressed out, and frequently has to deal with Lilo and Stitch's antics.
 Dr. Jacques von Hämsterviel (voiced by Jeff Bennett) is Jumba's former lab partner who seeks to capture the genetic experiments he helped to create through financing, hiring Gantu for help. He works from his "prison cell" which he set up as a laboratory. His name is usually mispronounced much to his chagrin, usually as "Hamsterwheel" or "Hamsterveal".
 Gantu (voiced by Kevin Michael Richardson) is forcibly retired from his position as captain of the Galactic Armada at the end of the original film, he serves as Hämsterviel's henchman. He fights against Lilo and Stitch in capturing the experiments but is usually defeated due to his arrogance, bad luck, and the abilities of Stitch.
 X-625/Reuben (voiced by Rob Paulsen) is Gantu's sidekick in capturing experiments. He is a genetic experiment who has all the abilities of Stitch (plus a greater fluency in English). However, he is a lazy coward who prefers to make sandwiches rather than fight. Although he is now known as "Reuben", he was not given this name until Leroy & Stitch, and was referred to by his experiment number throughout The Series, although Lilo called him "Sandwich Boy" once in the episode "627".

Recurring
 Mertle Edmonds (voiced by Liliana Mumy) is Lilo's classmate and rival. She appeared in many episodes of the series, usually causing conflicts for the title duo in the episodes she appeared in.
 David Kawena (voiced by Dee Bradley Baker) is Nani's boyfriend who is a local surfer and fire performer, and is aware of the existence of aliens. He appeared in "Richter", "Cannonball", "Yin-Yang", "Splodyhead", "Fibber", "Amnesio", "Poxy", "Hunkahunka", and "Wishy-Washy".
 X-624/Angel (voiced by Tara Strong) is Stitch's main love interest. Angel is a pink female experiment who was designed to turn the good experiments evil with a siren song. She was caught by Gantu at the end of her episode and was later rescued in "Snafu". She only appeared in those two episodes along with a cameo in "Remmy".
 X-007/Gigi (voiced by Tress MacNeille) is Mertle's pet. Gigi is a Shih-Tzu like experiment and her "one true place" is with Mertle as her pet. She first appeared in "Yapper" (which focused on her and is named after the nickname Lilo gave her) and later appeared in "Amnesio" and "PJ".
 X-221/Sparky (voiced by Frank Welker) is the first of Stitch's cousins that Stitch met. Sparky is a yellow experiment designed to create electric energy. His place where he truly belongs is in the old lighthouse to utilize his electric skills to generate light. He appeared in "Elastico", "The Asteroid", "Angel", "Skip", "Checkers", "Ploot", "Remmy", and "Snafu".
 Cobra Bubbles (voiced by Kevin Michael Richardson) is a mysterious government agent who is working as a social worker and the only known human aside from Lilo's family who is aware of the aliens and experiments. He appeared in "Amnesio", "The Asteroid", and "Shush", while the title experiment of the episode "Spooky" (Experiment 300) changed into Bubbles to trick and frighten Nani (Ving Rhames, who played Cobra in the original film and Stitch! The Movie, was also credited in this episode alongside Richardson).
 Elena (voiced by Jillian Henry), Teresa (voiced by Kali Whitehurst), and Yuki (voiced by Lili Ishida) are classmates of Mertle and Lilo who form a posse with the former. They usually travel in a group and seldom say anything other than a sarcastic "Yeah!" in unison when agreeing with Mertle on something. They appeared in several episodes of The Series.
 Mr. Wong (voiced by Clyde Kusatsu) is the owner of the rental hut on Lahui Beach and Nani's employer in early season one. He appears in "Richter" and "Holio", and is mentioned in "Cannonball".
 Mrs. Edmonds (voiced by April Winchell) is Mertle's mother, who is kinder than her daughter. She appeared in "Clip", "Holio", "Houdini", "Finder", "Bonnie & Clyde", "Spike", "Belle", and "Shush".
 Grand Councilwoman (voiced by Zoe Caldwell) is the leader of the United Galactic Federation, she is the one who banished Stitch in the first film. She later agrees to let Lilo and Stitch become official experiment hunters in order to retrieve all of the remaining experiments. She only appeared in "Finder".
 Keoni Jameson (voiced by Shaun Fleming) is a young, laid-back boy on whom Lilo has a crush. Lilo constantly tries to vie for his affections. He had a crush on Pleakley, whom he knows as Lilo's 'aunt', in the episode "Hunkahunka", but in "Nosy" he stated that he only had the crush for that one week. His father owns several businesses on Kauai. He has a friend who just happens to be a girl (not a girlfriend, though). He also appeared in "Kixx", "Amnesio", "Swirly", "Melty", "Sinker", and "Morpholomew".
 Mr. Jameson (voiced by Bryan Cranston) is the father of Keoni and, on several occasions, Nani's employer. He owns several businesses around Kauai, including the Birds of Paradise Hotel. He appeared in "Cannonball", "Melty", "Nosy", "Babyfier", "Checkers", and "Link".
 Moses Puloki (voiced by Kunewa Mook) is the hula teacher of Lilo's hālau hula, where he teaches Lilo, Victoria, Mertle, Yuki, Elena, and Teresa how to hula. He is very patient with his students and tolerates their antics. Lilo and her friends often call Moses, "Kumu", Hawaiian for teacher. He appeared in several episodes of The Series.
 Officer Kahiko is a police officer who knows Lilo well and occasionally tries to keep her out of trouble when she isn't accompanied by Nani. He appeared in the episodes "Holio", "Bonnie & Clyde", "Snooty", and "Shush".
 Victoria (voiced by Alyson Stoner) is Lilo's new (human) best friend in the second season, whom she meets in the episode "Swapper". Throughout the episode, Lilo tries to prove to her she wasn't weird. However, Victoria reveals she likes weird stuff so she and Lilo become best friends. Victoria is also in Lilo's hula class and owns Snooty (Experiment 277) as a pet. She appeared in "Swapper", "Snooty", "Slick", "Remmy", and "Wishy-Washy".
 Mrs. Lynne Hasagawa (voiced by Amy Hill) is a little old lady who owns Kokaua Town's fruit stand. As seen in the first segment of "Mrs. Hasagawa's Cats/Ace", several experiments live with her. She appeared in several episodes of The Series.
 Ice Cream Man (voiced by Frank Welker) – This unnamed character is a running gag throughout the Lilo & Stitch franchise. Whenever he appears, he drops his ice cream (usually a mint-flavored ice cream, presumably from its color) from its cone before he can finish it. This character has no speaking parts in The Series except saying "Whoa!" when he tripped over a pod. He also cries after suffering from X-151 (Babyfier)'s effects. His real eyes can be seen in the episode "Swirly".
 Various characters (voiced by Michael Yingling)

Production
In July 2002, Thomas Schumacher, then-president of Walt Disney Feature Animation, announced that Disney was developing a television series sequel to the film for Disney Channel in fall 2003 under the working title of Stitch! The TV Series. The series was announced alongside the direct-to-video film, Stitch! The Movie. Television animation directors Tony Craig and Bobs Gannaway, who both worked on Disney animated series such as House of Mouse and The Lion King's Timon & Pumbaa, and television screenwriter Jess Winfield, who wrote for Teacher's Pet and Buzz Lightyear of Star Command, served as executive producers of the show. Victor Cook and Don MacKinnon directed for the show's first 39 episodes, which comprised the first season. For the remaining 26 episodes, which comprised the second season, Rob LaDuca replaced MacKinnon as the other main director alongside Cook, while Craig directed two episodes, "Spike" and "Shoe".

Release

Home media
Only a few episodes of Lilo & Stitch: The Series were released on home media in the United States. The episodes "Clip" and "Mr. Stenchy" were bonus features for a DVD board game called Lilo & Stitch's Island of Adventures that was released on November 11, 2003. Another two episodes, "Slushy" and "Poxy", were released on separate Game Boy Advance Video compilations of Disney Channel series. Finally, the final episode "Link" was a bonus feature on the Leroy & Stitch DVD that was released on June 27, 2006, a month before the episode aired on television.

Streaming
Lilo & Stitch: The Series was available on the now-defunct DisneyLife streaming service in the United Kingdom.

The first American digital streaming release for The Series was via the TV Everywhere service DisneyNow in 2018, while the show reran on Disney XD, although it was later removed from the service in August that year. It was later made digitally available in the United States again and in other countries on Disney+ when that service launched on November 12, 2019, alongside all four feature-length Lilo & Stitch films. For unknown reasons, Disney+'s listing claims The Seriess original run ended in 2004 rather than 2006.

Reception
In a review for the finale film Leroy & Stitch, AllMovie's Skyler Miller called Lilo & Stitch: The Series a "high quality" television series, stating that it "was a pleasant surprise to fans of the 2002 film, continuing its good-natured, offbeat spirit while introducing the ingenious plot device of having the titular duo capture and rehabilitate Stitch's 625 'cousins.'"

Betsy Wallace of Common Sense Media gave the show's quality 3 out of 5 stars, applicable for ages 6 and above. Wallace noted that "Lilo frequently demonstrates compassion to creatures," but ultimately deemed the series's humor to be its "strong point", pointing out that the show "even makes fun of [its own] scant educational content."

In his 2018 book The Encyclopedia of American Animated Television Shows, author David Perlmutter wrote that the show's concept was "saddled [...] with formulaic and derivative elements" that were not found in the original film, though he praised Kevin McDonald's vocal performance as Pleakley, calling said performance "clever and amusing" and "the show's central [sic] grace".

Awards and nominations

|-
|2004
|Jason Oliver & Steve Dierkens for episode "Sprout"
|Motion Picture Sound Editors Award for Best Sound Editing in Television Animation: Music
|
|-
|2005
|Michael Tavera
|Daytime Emmy Award for Outstanding Music Direction and Composition
|
|-

See also

 Stitch!, an anime series that serves as the second television series in the Lilo & Stitch franchise, taking place years after Lilo & Stitch: The Series
 Stitch & Ai, a Chinese animated series that serves as the third television series in the franchise, which was partially worked on by some of the same production crew as Lilo & Stitch: The Series

Notes

References

External links

 
 

Lilo & Stitch (franchise)
2000s American animated television series
2000s American comic science fiction television series
2003 American television series debuts
2006 American television series endings
ABC Kids (TV programming block)
American children's animated action television series
American children's animated adventure television series
American children's animated comic science fiction television series
American children's animated science fantasy television series
Crossover animated television series
Disney Channel original programming
English-language television shows
Animated television shows based on films
Television series based on Disney films
Television series by Disney Television Animation
Television shows set in Hawaii
Animated television series about children
Animated television series about extraterrestrial life
American sequel television series